Club Leonés O.P. was a team that play during the Amateur period of the Mexican Football league. They played their games in Mexico City.

1931–32
During this season, as Basque teams such as Aurrerá and Club España, the league decided to invite two teams in order to complete the eight teams for the season. The teams that were invited were Veracruz Sporting and Club Leones.

Since these teams were new they did not fare well in the season. Club Leones attempted to play veteran players from other teams such as Nieves Hernández,  Miguel "Venada" Alatorre y Lage, combined with a few rookies who later became professionals such as "Chueco" Arteaga.

That season Leonés ended up winning 2 games, 1 draw, and 11 loses.

1932–33
With the league expanding the number of team to 10, the teams were divided into two groups of five with Leonés was placed in group B. Leonés were going as first place in their group on the game of the season with Germania one point behind. The game started quickly for Germania taking the 3–0 lead until Leonés tied it up in the first half. In the second half Leonés went up 4–3 and then Germania tied it up towards to end to finish the match 4–4.

Leonés ended up playing the worst team in group Asturias in order to see what team would be relegated. The playoff was a two leg game with Asturias winning both games with an aggregate 15–5. The games were on August 6 and 13 with scores of 6–2 and 9–3.

In the second games Asturias' center forward Pepe Pacheco scored 6 goals, a record that would remain until Isidro Lángara scored 7 goals in 1946.

After the season, all teams except México FC were dissolved. Mexico FC was accepted by the league because it was the older from the team in group B and it required six teams for the following season.

Player Records

Top scorers

Honours
 Liga Amateur del Distrito Federal Grupo B (1): 1932–33

Defunct football clubs in Mexico City
Association football clubs established in 1915
1915 establishments in Mexico
1933 disestablishments in Mexico
Association football clubs disestablished in 1933
Primera Fuerza teams